Grimes is an unincorporated community in Roger Mills County, Oklahoma, United States.

The Grimes post office opened on March 1, 1901 with John Gernade Lancaster as first Postmaster, and closed on November 26, 1971.  Benjamin C. Olson was the last postmaster in Grimes.  He then became the postmaster in nearby Sweetwater, Oklahoma. The community was named for acting Oklahoma territorial governor William C. Grimes. 1947

Grimes was hit by a violent tornado on the night of April 9, 1947. The tornado was the same night as the 1947 Woodward Oklahoma tornado.  The Grimes tornado resulted in the destruction of the blacksmith shop, one home and barn.  The home, owned by Ole C Olson and wife Leah Turbyfill Olson was partially destroyed.  Ole C Olson was mortally wounded and later died in an Oklahoma City Hospital.

References

Unincorporated communities in Roger Mills County, Oklahoma
Unincorporated communities in Oklahoma